The Samsung Galaxy Tab S 8.4 is an 8.4-inch Android-based tablet computer produced and marketed by Samsung Electronics. It belongs to the ultra high-end "S" line of the cross between the Samsung Galaxy Tab and Samsung Galaxy S series, which also includes a 10.5-inch model, the Samsung Galaxy Tab S 10.5. It was announced on 12 June 2014, and subsequently released on 2 July 2014. It is available in Wi-Fi  only and both Wi-Fi, 4G variants. This is Samsung's second 8.4-inch tablet which is aimed to be a direct competitor against the LG G Pad 8.3 and the iPad Mini 2.

History 
The Galaxy Tab S 8.4 was announced on 12 June 2014. It was shown along with the Galaxy Tab S 10.5 at the Samsung Galaxy Premier 2014 in New York City.

Features
The Galaxy Tab S 8.4 was released with Android 4.4.4 Kitkat. Samsung customized the interface with its TouchWiz Nature UX 3.0 software. As well as the standard suite of Google apps, it includes Samsung apps such as ChatON, S Suggest, S Voice, S Translator, S Planner, WatchON, Smart Stay, Multi-Window, Group Play, All Share Play, Samsung Magazine, Professional pack, Multi-user mode and SideSync 3.0.

The Galaxy Tab S 8.4 is available in Wi-Fi-only and 4G/LTE & WiFi variants. Storage ranges from 16 GB to 32 GB depending on the model, with a microSDXC card slot for expansion up to 128 GB. Color options include white, charcoal gray, and titanium bronze. It has an 8.4-inch Quad HD Super AMOLED (16:10) screen with a resolution of 2560x1600 pixels and a pixel density of 359 ppi. It also features a 2.1 MP front camera without flash and a rear-facing 8.0 MP AF camera with LED flash. It also has the ability to record HD videos.

See also

Comparison of tablet computers
Samsung Galaxy Tab series
Samsung Galaxy S series
Samsung Galaxy Tab Pro 8.4

References

External links
 

Samsung Galaxy Tab series
Android (operating system) devices
Tablet computers introduced in 2014
Tablet computers